Silvia Kal (Madrid, January 5, 1983) is a Spanish actress and model based in the United States. She has participated in advertising campaigns for brands like Google, Sony and Natura Bissé and has appeared in magazines like GQ, Esquire,  Maxim, Vogue and Men's Health. She began her acting career in 2006 participating in the film Goya's Ghosts by Miloš Forman.

Biography

Early years 
Kal was born in Madrid in 1983. After studying at the European University of Madrid, she began working as a model and actress, making her film debut in Miloš Forman feature film Goya's Ghosts, a 2006 Spanish-American production starring Javier Bardem, Stellan Skarsgård and Natalie Portman. In 2010, Kal decided to move to Los Angeles to continue her acting career there.

Career 
In the United States she enrolled at the Ivana Chubbuck Studio to study drama and began to appear in minor roles in films like Martin Scorsese's The Wolf of Wall Street and Clint Eastwood's Jersey Boys, and in television series such as Melodía de amor and Anger Management. In 2016 Kal played Catarina in Walt Perez feature film Here in the East and the same year she starred in the live action trailer for Mobile Strike, a strategy video game with Arnold Schwarzenegger as the main character. In 2017 she played Kate White in the TV series Scorpion Girl and participated in the feature film Caravaggio and My Mother the Pope, directed by Gladys Florence.

After appearing in the TV series Crypto Game and in the 2019 thriller Chameleon, she wrote the story for the short film Breathe Jans, Breathe, which is currently in post-production. In 2021, her presence was confirmed in the Spanish feature film Las niñas de cristal, directed by Jota Linares.

In her career as a model, she has participated in advertising campaigns for brands such as Swim by Judit, Google, Natura Bissé and Sony, and has appeared in magazines such as GQ, Esquire,  Maxim, Vogue, Elle and Men's Health. In 2013 Kal appeared in the music video "Let the Bass Go" by Snoop Dogg, for the soundtrack of the animated film Turbo. In 2017 she collaborated with Spanish singer David Bisbal in the music video for the song "Fiebre", one of the singles from his album Hijos del mar.

In 2022, she played the role of Laura in the Spanish film Dancing on Glass.

Filmography

Film

Television

Video

References

External links 

 
 

1983 births
Living people
20th-century Spanish actresses
21st-century Spanish actresses
Actresses from Madrid
Spanish expatriates in the United States